The Ranica (also: Ramna) is a left tributary of the river Belareca in Romania. It flows into the Belareca in Cornereva.

References

Rivers of Romania
Rivers of Caraș-Severin County